Drum Tower is a historic building constructed in 1782 in Bangkok located on side of Sanam Chai Road, Phra Borom Maha Ratchawang Subdistrict, Phra Nakhon District, beside to Wat Pho and Territorial Defense Command.

References 

Phra Nakhon district
Buildings and structures in Bangkok
1982 establishments in Thailand